Baldwin 60000 is an experimental steam locomotive built by the Baldwin Locomotive Works in Eddystone, Pennsylvania, in 1926, during the height of the railroading industry. It received its number for being the 60,000th locomotive built by Baldwin.

It was designed to be the best locomotive that Baldwin ever made.

60000 was very innovative, carrying unusual technology, including a water-tube firebox. This was intended to improve efficiency but the tubes were prone to burst inside the firebox. It is also a compound, expanding the steam once in the inside cylinder and then again in the two outside cylinders. Although compounding increases efficiency, it was an extra complication that the US railroads had mostly rejected by the middle twenties. The weight and length of the engine were too much for all but the heaviest and straightest tracks.

This locomotive was experimental and was meant to be the model for future development.  However, its demonstration runs never persuaded railroads to purchase more. In 1933, it was donated to the Franklin Institute Science Museum in Philadelphia, Pennsylvania and remains there today.

Testing
After a series of brief test runs following construction, the 60000 was sent to the Pennsylvania Railroad's Altoona Test Plant in Altoona, Pennsylvania. Placed on rollers without its tender, it was tested on the traction dynamometer to measure its performance, which included maximum drawbar horsepower. Following tests at the Altoona Test Plant, the Pennsylvania Railroad placed the engine in freight service between Enola Yard near Harrisburg and Morrisville Yard via the Trenton Cutoff. During testing on the PRR, 60000 pulled a maximum of 7,700 tons.

Following testing on the PRR, the 60000 was sent for additional testing on the Baltimore and Ohio Railroad. Between November and December 1926, the 60000 was tested on the Cumberland Division between Brunswick and Keyser, Maryland, the Connellsville Division between Cumberland, Maryland, and Connellsville, Pennsylvania, and the Pittsburgh Division, which included the Sand Patch and Seventeen-Mile grades.

In February 1927, the 60000 was sent to the Chicago, Burlington and Quincy Railroad's Beardstown Division of Illinois. The 60000 was run in tandem with the CB&Q's own M2-A Class 2-10-2 number 6157, in order to compare coal and water consumption. Overall, the 60000 was superior in its coal and water consumption.

On 24 February 1927, the 60000 was sent to the Atchison, Topeka and Santa Fe Railroad. Testing was performed on the Pecos division between Clovis and Belen, New Mexico. As with the CB&Q, the AT&SF compared the performance of the 60000 with that of its own power in the form of two 3800-Class 2-10-2s. Once more the 60000 demonstrated superior fuel consumption than the locomotives of the host railroad.

In the summer and fall of 1927, the 60000 was sent to the Southern Pacific Railroad, which overhauled the locomotive and converted it to an oil burner at its Sacramento Shops. Following its conversion, the 60000 was tested in both freight and passenger service on the Sacramento Division, during which the engine carried a Southern Pacific tender. Following tests on the SP, the 60000 was sent to the Great Northern Railway between Everett, Washington and Minot, North Dakota. Overall, the 60000 did not perform as well on oil as it did on coal.

Converted back to coal, the 60000 was then returned to the Baldwin Locomotive Works and used as a stationary boiler before being donated to the Franklin Institute.  The locomotive was moved from the Baltimore and Ohio Railroad tracks at 24th and Vine Street over temporary tracks to the museum building which was then still under construction. The locomotive was placed in the building through an opening in the western wall.

References 

Experimental locomotives
High-pressure steam locomotives
60000
4-10-2 locomotives
Individual locomotives of the United States
Franklin Institute
Unique locomotives
Freight locomotives
Standard gauge locomotives of the United States
Compound locomotives
Preserved steam locomotives of Pennsylvania